Barten is a surname. Notable people with the surname include:

Anton Barten (1930–2016), Dutch economist
Franz Barten (1912–1944), German World War II fighter pilot
Herb Barten (born 1928), American middle-distance runner
Mike Barten (born 1973), German footballer and manager